The Lentz Center for Asian Culture was located at 1155 Q Street in downtown Lincoln, Nebraska. Part of the University of Nebraska-Lincoln, the Lentz Center recognized the rich and varied cultures of Asia. The Center was meant to embody the University's commitment to fostering multicultural understanding through an appreciation of Asian cultures.

In 2010 the collection closed to public visitation, but the collection was digitized for viewing online. It is now known as the Lentz Collection for Asian Culture.

References

External links 
 Lentz Collection for Asian Culture official website

Museums in Lincoln, Nebraska
University of Nebraska–Lincoln
University museums in Nebraska
Art museums and galleries in Nebraska
Asian art museums in the United States
Ethnic museums in Nebraska
Defunct museums in the United States